Romeo Alexandru Buteseacă (born 26 July 1978) is a Romanian professional footballer who plays as a striker for Liga III side Avântul Valea Mărului. In his career Buteseacă played for teams such as: Dunărea Galați, Oțelul Galați, Dacia Unirea Brăila or Gloria Buzău, among others.

References

External links
 

1978 births
Living people
Sportspeople from Galați
Romanian footballers
Association football forwards
Liga I players
ASC Oțelul Galați players
Liga II players
FCM Dunărea Galați players
CSM Jiul Petroșani players
FC Vaslui players
AFC Dacia Unirea Brăila players